Circus is a 2000 British/American neo noir crime film directed by Rob Walker and written by David Logan. The movie stars John Hannah, Famke Janssen, Peter Stormare, Brian Conley, Fred Ward and Eddie Izzard. It was released in the United Kingdom on 5 May 2000 and in the United States on 15 September 2000.

Plot
Con artists Leo (John Hannah) and Lily (Famke Janssen) are partners both in work and in life. Lily wants to get out of the racket and settle down in a nice place somewhere far away. Leo agrees, saying that within a week they should have enough to leave for good.

Leo's cousin Bruno (Brian Conley) is having a problem with his casino losing money. He wants Leo to run it. But he hates Leo and wants to get rid of him.

Further complicating Leo's life is Julius (Peter Stormare) who has asked Leo to kill his wife, Gloria. Only when it comes time to be paid, Julius, who has Leo committing the murder on tape, confesses he does not have a wife; he paid a woman to pretend to be his wife. Julius wants 500,000 in pounds, otherwise, he will release the tape to the authorities.

Then Moose shows up and he is looking for a woman who is the love of his life. Her name is Gloria. He asks if Leo could help him find her and Leo reluctantly agrees.

Finally, there's Troy, a loan shark. Leo owes him a lot of money, but he has lost it all at the track. Troy is getting increasingly impatient and violent as he does not like to be kept waiting on his money.

Evidence is piling up that Lily is working a con on Leo. With all these problems, it does not look as if Leo will survive the week.

Bruno's in trouble with the Inland Revenue, so his accountant, Julius, comes up with an idea to con Lily by turning all of Bruno's shipping company over to her, while Bruno pockets a $20 million. Only the problem is that Leo has got to Julius first and worked out a con of his own. Together Julius and Leo staged Gloria's murder.

Leo goes to meet Julius with the blackmail money. Bruno has men with guns waiting, but Moose shows up to even out the fight. A bloodbath ensues and Julius, the only survivor, tells the tale to Bruno.

Only Leo is not dead, and he leaves a recording that Lily finds and then shows to Bruno. Leo figured out that Lily was conning him, and he confesses that he stole Bruno's money. An enraged Lily and Bruno go to find Julius and catch him as he is splitting town. But then Leo shows up wanting to kill Bruno.

Bruno says that Leo cannot possibly kill him because he would have to kill his wife also. Reluctantly Leo agrees, and shoots Lily. Then he convinces Julius that the only way they can be partners is if he kills Bruno, so that they have a murder each on their hands. Julius does not mean to, but the gun goes off and Bruno is dead.

During their getaway, Julius begins to feel odd. Leo confesses that he slipped a sedative into Julius' drink. He leaves a drugged Julius by the side of the road and with the con finished he makes his way to the train station where he meets up with Lily.

Cast
 John Hannah as Leo
 Famke Janssen as Lily Garfield 
 Peter Stormare as Julius
 Eddie Izzard as Troy 
 Fred Ward as Elmo
 Brian Conley as Bruno
 Tom Lister Jr. as Moose 
 Amanda Donohoe as Gloria
 Ian Burfield as Caspar
 Neil Stuke as Roscoe
 Michael Attwell as Magnus
 Jason Watkins as Dom
 Christopher Biggins as Arnie
 Hinda Hicks, had a small cameo role as Kelly, a jazz singer.

Reception
, the film holds a 9% approval rating on Rotten Tomatoes, based on eleven reviews with an average rating of 4.73/10.

References

External links
 
 
 
 
 

2000 films
2000 crime thriller films
British crime thriller films
British neo-noir films
Films set in Brighton
2000 directorial debut films
2000s English-language films
2000s British films